Wali is a given name. Notable people with the name include:

Wali Dewane (1826–1881), Kurdish poet
Wali Jones (born 1942), American basketball player
Wali Lundy (born 1983), American football player
Wali Rainer (born 1977), American football player
Wali Mohammed Wali (1667–1707), Indian classical Urdu poet
Wali-ur-Rahman (1916–2006), Bangladeshi Islamic scholar

See also
Wally (given name)
Wali (surname)